General elections were held in Malta on 28 and 29 September 1898.

Background
The elections were held under the Knutsford Constitution. Ten members were elected from single-member constituencies, whilst a further four members were elected to represent nobility and landowners, graduates, clerics and the Chamber of Commerce.

Results
A total of 9,863 people were registered to vote, of which 3,128 cast votes, giving a turnout of 32%. Paolo Sammut was elected to both the nobility and landowners' seat and the seat of constituency II, whilst no candidates stood for the seats for clerics and the Chamber of Commerce. Sammut chose to retain the seat for constituency II, and by-elections were held for the three vacant seats on 2 October.

References

1898
Malta
1898 in Malta
September 1898 events